Elizabeth or Eliza Co(o)k(e) may refer to:
Elizabeth Cook, American musician
Elizabeth Batts Cook (1742–1835), the wife and widow of Captain James Cook
Elizabeth Coke (pronounced Cook), English courtier
Elizabeth Cooke (1528 – 1609), English noblewoman
Eliza Cook, English writer
Eliza Cook (physician)

See also
Betty Cook, rower
Elizabeth Cook-Lynn, writer
Elizabeth Cook Primary School, Ingleside Independent School District
Elizabeth Cook, ship operated by Captain Cook Cruises, Australia